The Guadeloupe Fund was established by Sweden's Riksdag of the Estates in 1815 for the benefit of Crown Prince and Regent Charles XIV John of Sweden, (Swedish: Karl XIV Johan) also known as Jean Baptiste Jules Bernadotte, and his heirs.

Bernadotte had been one of the most successful soldiers in Napoleonic France. He was a Marshal of France, former minister of war and had been created Prince of Pontecorvo by Napoleon, before accepting the election as Crown Prince and heir to the Swedish throne. Under his adoptive father, the reigning and yet powerless King Charles XIII of Sweden, Crown Prince Charles John was effectively the regent of the country, and when Sweden sided with Napoleon's enemies, Charles John came to be seen as a traitor to his native France. Upon Sweden's accession to the Sixth Coalition, the offer of a West Indies island by Britain was an attempt to, in some way, compensate for this.

On February 4, 1810, the British seized the island of Guadeloupe and held it a consequence of the Napoleonic Wars. Guadeloupe was conveniently located in proximity to the Swedish colony of Saint-Barthélemy. On March 3, 1813, the island was ceded by Britain to "His Royal Majesty the King of Sweden, and his successor to the Swedish throne" according to the Act of Succession of September 26, 1810. This was supposedly in order to keep the Crown Prince "at least partially compensated for the donations and other property, which he had lost since being called to the succession of the Swedish throne", having also used proceeds of sales of his Italian and French property to pay off debts of Sweden and losses as a consequence of Sweden's involvement in the Napoleonic Wars.

After France had been defeated and Napoleon exiled to Elba, the Treaty of Paris of 1814 settled the terms of the peace, in which Guadeloupe, having previously been a French possession, was returned to France. On August 13, 1814, a settlement of 24 million francs was reached with Britain as a replacement for the intended compensation. The Crown Prince, acting as regent, used about half of the sum to pay off government debts; the rest went to various projects of public benefit. In recognition of this, the Riksdag of 1815 instituted that the Crown Prince and his heirs would receive an annual installment of 300,000 Riksdaler, which was to be paid out in perpetuity.

In the middle of the 20th century the scheme came under close scrutiny.  Following a settlement between the Crown of Britain and the House of Bernadotte, the last payment of the fund was made in 1983.

See also 
 Possessions of Sweden
 History of Sweden
 History of Guadeloupe

References

Other sources
Calloway, Colin G. (2006)   The Scratch of a Pen: 1763 and the Transformation of North America (Oxford University Press)  
Höjer, Torvald   (1943) Carl XIV Johan: Kronprinstiden (Stockholm: Nordstedts Förlag) 
Knight, Franklin W. (1997)  General History of the Caribbean (UNESCO) 

Swedish monarchy
1815 in Sweden
Economic history of Sweden